The following events occurred in January 1974:

January 1, 1974 (Tuesday)
The 1974 Australian Open concluded in Melbourne, Victoria, Australia.

At the driving of the first pile for the Komtar building in George Town, Penang, Malaysia, Prime Minister Abdul Razak Hussein said that the tower "would change the face of the city".
Finland concluded a free trade agreement with the European Economic Community.
Parental insurance came into force in Sweden.
West Germany concluded a framework agreement with Botswana on development aid.
West Germany took over the Presidency of the Council of the European Communities.
Ernst Brugger became President of the Swiss Confederation.
An Itavia Fokker airliner crashed and burned on approach to Turin, Italy, killing 38 of the 42 people aboard.
On the seventh annual World Day of Peace, Pope Paul VI gave a sermon at St. Anthony's Church in Rome, saying that peace "deals with life itself, more even than the physical safety of populations, of their honor, of their name, of their history... Will peace last: yes or no?"
New Year's Day was celebrated as a public holiday in the United Kingdom for the first time.
The Troubles:
The Executive of the 1974 Northern Ireland Assembly, comprising Brian Faulkner's moderate Ulster Unionist Party and the non-violent nationalists of the Social Democratic and Labour Party, was formed in Belfast, Northern Ireland.
24-year-old Catholic civilian John Whyte was shot and killed during an Irish Republican Army sniper attack on a British Army mobile patrol in Belfast.
Due to the oil crisis, large numbers of gas stations throughout the United States were closed on New Year's Day. Mrs. Judith Kathleen Bovard of Lake Jackson, Texas, was killed when her car crashed and burned while carrying a can of gasoline.
Maurice Nadon, who had been the Acting Commissioner of the Royal Canadian Mounted Police (RCMP) since December 29, was formally appointed as the 16th commissioner, becoming the first French Canadian to hold the post.
The Canadian Stock Exchange merged with the Montreal Stock Exchange, with the merged entity operating under the latter name.
Woodsworth College at the University of Toronto was founded, formally integrating part-time degree students into the University.
The city of Detroit, Michigan, began the new year with five homicides on New Year's Day, one of them a shooting at one minute past midnight.
A 22-inch natural gas transmission pipeline failed in Prairie du Rocher, Illinois. The resulting explosion caused no injuries, but 7,000 people in the area were left without gas heating for several sub-freezing days.
Four Walla Walla, Washington, firefighters were buried under rubble when the roof and second story of the Pe-Ge Tavern collapsed during a fire and pushed the front of the building into the street. Fire Marshal Gabriel Tichi was killed almost instantly, while firefighter Woodrow Groom Jr. died of head injuries later that day at Kadlec Hospital in Richland, Washington. The other two firemen survived.
At the 1974 Orange Bowl, played at the Miami Orange Bowl in Miami, Florida, the Penn State Nittany Lions defeated the LSU Tigers by a score of 16–9.
At the 1974 Cotton Bowl Classic, played at the Cotton Bowl in Dallas, Texas, the Nebraska Cornhuskers defeated the Texas Longhorns by a score of 19–3.
At the 1974 Rose Bowl, played at the Rose Bowl in Pasadena, California, the Ohio State Buckeyes defeated the USC Trojans by a score of 42–21.
Roger T. Sweitzer of Anaheim, California and other members of the Outraged Consumers Action Committee destroyed Sweitzer's 1972 Ford Pinto by pounding it to bits on the grounds of a Ford Motor Company assembly plant in Pico Rivera, California.
Born:
Mehdi Ben Slimane, Tunisian footballer; in Le Kram, Tunisia
Mario Benetton, Italian Olympic track cyclist; in Padua, Italy
Cadu (born Ricardo Frederico Rodrigues Antunes), Brazilian footballer; in Rio de Janeiro, Brazil
Constantinos Carydis, Greek conductor; in Athens, Greece
Abha Dawesar, Indian novelist; in New Delhi, Delhi, India
Ivone De Franceschi, Italian footballer; in Padua, Italy
Derek Kilmer, member of the United States House of Representatives from Washington; in Port Angeles, Washington
Reem Maged, Egyptian journalist
Samukeliso Moyo, Zimbabwean Olympic long-distance runner; in Gwanda, Matabeleland South Province, Rhodesia
Christian Paradis, Canadian politician, Member of Parliament, Minister of Industry; in Thetford Mines, Quebec
Jonah Peretti, American Internet entrepreneur; in Contra Costa County, California
Emiliano Salvetti, Italian footballer; in Forlì, Italy
Marco Schreyl, German television and radio host; in Erfurt, East Germany
İsmet Taşdemir, Turkish footballer and football coach; in Iğdır, Turkey
Giorgos Theodotou, Cypriot footballer; in Ammochostos, Cyprus
Died:
Charles E. Bohlen, 69, American diplomat and ambassador
Jimmy Smith, 78, American Major League Baseball infielder
Charles M. Teague, 64, member of the United States House of Representatives from California

January 2, 1974 (Wednesday)
Skylab 4: On their 48th day of spaceflight, the Skylab crew held a televised news conference from space, during which astronaut William Pogue said that he tried too hard to do a good job in the early phases of the mission, but then "finally came to the realization that I'm a fallible human being". Mission commander Gerald Carr said that he missed drinking cold beer while watching football. Astronaut Edward Gibson said that he was pleased to be contributing to science.
All 56 crew members were rescued.
Carlos Arias Navarro was sworn in as Prime Minister of Spain, having been appointed to the position after the assassination of Luis Carrero Blanco on December 20, 1973.
The first checks were mailed under the Supplemental Security Income (SSI) program in the United States, which had come into effect on January 1.
Watergate scandal: E. Howard Hunt was released from jail pending the outcome of his appeal for his role in the Watergate burglary.
Coleman Young was sworn in as the first African-American mayor of Detroit, Michigan. In his inaugural speech, he warned criminals to "hit the road".
Born:
Torsten Abel, German triathlete; in West Berlin
Helen Clitheroe (born Helen Teresa Pattinson), English Olympic middle-distance and long-distance runner; in Preston, Lancashire, England
Simone Confalone, Italian footballer; in Rimini, Italy
Jason de Vos, Canadian footballer; in London, Ontario, Canada
Slavko Duščak, Slovenian basketball player and coach; in Ljubljana, Socialist Federal Republic of Yugoslavia
Ludmila Formanová, Czech middle-distance runner; in Čáslav, Czechoslovakia
Juha Lind, Finnish professional and Olympic ice hockey player; in Helsinki, Finland
Jean Nuttli, Swiss cyclist; in Kriens, Switzerland
Tomáš Řepka, Czech footballer; in Slavičín, Czechoslovakia
Deborah Sengl, Austrian painter and artist; in Vienna, Austria
Yin Yin, Chinese Olympic volleyball player; in Zhejiang, China
Died:
Ralph Block, 84, American film producer and screenwriter
Errett Lobban Cord, 79, American business executive and politician
Fernand de Montigny, 88, Belgian Olympic fencer, field hockey player and architect
Mark Fax, 62, American composer
Neva Gerber, 79, American silent film actress
Heinrich Glasmeyer, 80, German politician, member of the Bundestag
Tex Ritter, 68, American actor and country musician

January 3, 1974 (Thursday)
In Victoria Street, East Sydney, a 30-man team of workmen used sledgehammers and axes to batter down the doors of 19 houses, 13 of which were occupied by squatters who had barricaded themselves inside, protesting against a proposed development.
Detective Police Constable Lau See Kaw was shot and killed by communist gunmen at Malim Nawar, Perak, Malaysia.

A new constitution for the Socialist Republic of the Union of Burma took effect, establishing a one-party regime. It had been approved in a constitutional referendum held on 15 December. Burma also adopted a new flag.
Navnirman Andolan (Re-invention Movement): In Ahmedabad, Gujarat, India, students of an engineering school who had been up in arms since December 20 against the increase in the price of meals in the school canteen confronted the police who tried to intervene. Some students were arrested.
Georges Pompidou, the President of France, reaffirmed that France would continue to conduct nuclear weapons testing in the South Pacific Ocean. This drew an angry response from Australian unionists and the New Zealand Government.
Skylab program: Dale D. Myers of NASA Headquarters wrote a letter to the directors of Marshall Space Flight Center, Johnson Space Center and Kennedy Space Center concerning the retention of capability for a Skylab II launch until it was determined whether NASA would proceed with a second Skylab space station or with the Space Shuttle program.
Born:
Davide Ancilotto, Italian basketball player; in Mestre, Venice, Italy (died 1997)
MV Bill (born Alexandre Pereira Barbosa), Brazilian rapper, actor and songwriter; in Rio de Janeiro, Brazil
Sibylle Blanc, Swiss actress, writer and director; in Aubonne, Vaud, Switzerland
François Choquette, Canadian politician, Member of Parliament; in Granby, Quebec, Canada
Robert-Jan Derksen, Dutch professional golfer; in Nijmegen, Netherlands
Mike Ireland, Canadian Olympic long track speed skater; in Winnipeg, Manitoba, Canada
Kentarō Itō, Japanese voice and stage actor; in Hachiōji, Tokyo, Japan
Juan Pérez, Spanish Olympic team handball player; in Badajoz, Province of Badajoz, Spain
Alessandro Petacchi, Italian road racing cyclist; in La Spezia, Italy
Katie Porter, member of the United States House of Representatives from California; in Fort Dodge, Webster County, Iowa
Franck Riester, French politician; in Paris, France
Francisco Rivera Ordóñez, Spanish bullfighter; in Madrid, Spain
Frank Schmidt, German footballer and manager; in Heidenheim an der Brenz, West Germany
Mikhail Segal, Russian film director; in Oryol, Russian Soviet Federative Socialist Republic, Soviet Union
Hiroko Tamoto, Japanese Olympic softball center fielder; in Kumamoto Prefecture, Japan
Pablo Thiam, Guinean footballer; in Conakry, Guinea
Todd Warriner, Canadian professional and Olympic ice hockey player; in Blenheim, Ontario, Canada
Hayley Yelling, British runner; in Dorchester, Dorset, England
Faat Zakirov, Russian cyclist; in Andijan, Uzbek Soviet Socialist Republic, Soviet Union
Died:
Gino Cervi, 72, Italian film and television actor
Arthur Daley, 69, American sports journalist
Anatoly Karelin, 51, Soviet Korean War flying ace, Hero of the Soviet Union
Maksim Shtraukh, 73, Soviet film and theater actor
Red Snapp, 85, American baseball player
Kin'yuki Sonoike, 87, Japanese author

January 4, 1974 (Friday)
A light plane crashed north of Barkly Downs homestead en route to Mount Isa Airport, Queensland. All four people aboard died, including three flood victims trying to get home to Darwin, Northern Territory.
In Mahlabatini, South Africa, Harry Schwarz and Chief Minister of KwaZulu Mangosuthu Buthelezi signed the Mahlabatini Declaration of Faith.
The Troubles: By a vote of 427-374, the Ulster Unionist Council voted to reject the Sunningdale Agreement.
Watergate scandal: Citing executive privilege, U.S. President Richard Nixon refused to surrender over 500 tapes subpoenaed by the Senate Watergate Committee.
Joni Lenz was attacked in her bedroom by serial killer Ted Bundy in Washington; she survived.
Born:
Ottaviano Andriani, Italian Olympic marathon runner; in Francavilla Fontana, Italy
Robert Dinu, Romanian Olympic water polo player; in Bucharest, Romania
Sindi Dlathu, South African actress and musician; in Meadowlands, Gauteng, South Africa
Ángela María Espinosa, Colombian Olympic fencer; in Cali, Valle del Cauca Department, Colombia
Vanessa Gravina, Italian film, television and stage actress; in Milan, Italy
Danilo Hondo, German Olympic road bicycle racer; in Guben, East Germany
Flora Montgomery, Northern Irish actress; in Greyabbey, County Down, Northern Ireland
Sonja Richter, Danish actress; in Esbjerg, Denmark
Fernando Sanz, Spanish footballer; in Madrid, Spain
Andrea Sottil, Italian footballer and football coach; in Venaria Reale, Italy
Tricky Stewart, American record producer, record executive, songwriter and music publisher; in Markham, Illinois
Armin Zöggeler, Italian Olympic champion luger; in Merano, South Tyrol, Italy
Died:
Abdul Ghafoor Breshna, 66, Afghan painter, composer, poet and film director
Phelim Calleary, 78, Irish politician, Teachta Dála for Mayo North (Dáil constituency)
Otto-Ernst Flick, 57, German businessman
Ellef Mohn, 79, Norwegian Olympic and professional footballer
Renzo Videsott, 69, Italian alpinist and conservationist

January 5, 1974 (Saturday)
The Worli riots began in the chawl of the Worli neighborhood of Bombay when the police attempted to disperse a rally of the Dalit Panthers that had turned violent.
The Troubles: 44-year-old Leo McCullagh, a Catholic civilian, was shot and killed by a Loyalist group at his home in Belfast.
Born:
Predrag Balašević, Serbian politician; in Podgorac, Boljevac, Socialist Republic of Serbia, SFR Yugoslavia
Kengo Hanazawa, Japanese manga artist; in Hachinohe, Japan
Vladimir Loginov, Kazakhstani footballer; in Oral, Kazakh Soviet Socialist Republic, Soviet Union
Vardan Minasyan, Armenian footballer and manager; in Yerevan, Armenian Soviet Socialist Republic, Soviet Union
Ryan Minor, American Major League Baseball third baseman; in Canton, Ohio
Alexey Panfili, Russian-Kazakhstani Olympic water polo player; in Bishkek, Kirghiz Soviet Socialist Republic, Soviet Union
David Salanon, French rally driver; in Saint-Étienne, Loire, France
Iwan Thomas, British Olympic sprinter; in Farnborough, London, England
Died:
Denis William Brogan, 73, Scottish author and historian
Erminia Caudana, 77, Italian restorer of ancient papyri
Joseph Fassbender, 70, German painter and draughtsman
Tay Hohoff (born Therese von Hohoff), 75, American literary editor
Béla Illés, 78, Hungarian writer and journalist
Dewey Mayhew, 75, American football and baseball coach
Lev Oborin, 66, Soviet pianist, composer and pedagogue
Vincent Starrett, 87, Canadian-American writer, journalist and bibliophile

January 6, 1974 (Sunday)
Global Television became Canada's third English-language television network when it began broadcasting in southern Ontario.
In response to the oil crisis, at 2 a.m. the United States began a trial period of year-round daylight saving time, enacted by Congress and intended to run through 2 a.m. on April 27, 1975. The act would later be amended to return to standard time for four months from October to February.
Commonwealth Commuter Flight 317 crashed on approach to Johnstown–Cambria County Airport in Pennsylvania, killing 12 of the 17 people on board.
Born:
Marlon Anderson, Major League Baseball utility player and sportscaster; in Montgomery, Alabama
Edgars Burlakovs, Latvian footballer; in Daugavpils, Latvian Soviet Socialist Republic, Soviet Union
Paolo Camossi, Italian Olympic triple jumper; in Gorizia, Italy
Milka Chulina, Venezuelan actress and model; in Ciudad Bolívar, Bolívar, Venezuela
Daniel Cordone, Argentinian footballer; in General Rodríguez Partido, Argentina
Fernando Correa, Uruguayan footballer and manager; in Montevideo, Uruguay
Wolfgang Dimetrik, Austrian classical accordionist
Paul Grant, American basketball player; in Pittsburgh, Pennsylvania
L.T. Hutton, American record producer and entrepreneur; in Chicago Heights, Illinois
Lee Sang-il, Zainichi Korean film director and screenwriter; in Niigata Prefecture, Japan
Elisa Miniati, Italian footballer; in Rome, Italy
Yuko Morimoto, Japanese footballer; in Osaka Prefecture, Japan
Romain Sardou, French novelist; in Boulogne-Billancourt, Hauts-de-Seine, France
Tiaré Scanda, Mexican actress; in Mexico City, D.F., Mexico
Dion Waller, New Zealand rugby union player; in Turangi, New Zealand
Barry Williams, Welsh international rugby union player; in Carmarthen, Carmarthenshire, Wales
Died:
David Alfaro Siqueiros, 77, Mexican painter and muralist
Charles Allen (RAF officer), 74, British World War I flying ace
Pyotr Nikiforov, 91, Russian revolutionary and Soviet politician
Lech Pijanowski, 45, Polish film critic, filmmaker and game designer
Margit Slachta, 89, Hungarian social activist and politician, Righteous Among the Nations

January 7, 1974 (Monday)
The 1974 New Zealand Open commenced in Auckland, New Zealand, and continued until 13 January.
Navnirman Andolan (Re-invention Movement): Protesting students in Gujarat, India, called for an indefinite strike in schools and colleges. They demanded lower fees, new campus facilities, better food and the arrest of black marketeers.
Initial outbreak of the Gombe Chimpanzee War in Gombe Stream National Park, Tanzania, with the killing of the Kahama chimpanzee Godi by eight members of the Kasakela chimpanzee community.
The Royal Danish Navy harbor tug Fremad V capsized and sank while towing the frigate Herluf Trolle at the Frederikshavn naval base. Two of the tug's crew members drowned.
Nineteen OPEC members met in Geneva, Switzerland, from January 7 through January 9. They decided to freeze oil prices until April 1. Saudi Arabia was willing to reduce crude oil prices but faced opposition from Algeria, Iraq and Iran.
The Troubles: Brian Faulkner resigned as the leader of the Ulster Unionist Party in the wake of its rejection of the Sunningdale agreement on January 4.
Bora Laskin was sworn in as the 14th Chief Justice of Canada to replace the retiring Gérald Fauteux. In appointing Laskin, Prime Minister Pierre Trudeau broke with tradition by passing over the more senior justice, Ronald Martland.
Born:
Varun Badola, Indian television actor; in New Delhi, India
Alenka Bikar, Slovenian Olympic sprinter and politician; in Ljubljana, Socialist Federal Republic of Yugoslavia
Julen Guerrero, Spanish footballer; in Portugalete, Spain
İbrahim Kutluay, Turkish basketball player
Vance McAllister, member of the United States House of Representatives from Louisiana; in Oak Grove, West Carroll Parish, Louisiana
Svetlana Metkina, Russian actress; in Moscow, Russian SFSR, Soviet Union
Died:
Charles Coulson, 63, British applied mathematician and theoretical chemist
Benjamin H. Kline, 79, American cinematographer and film director
Otto Koehler, 84, German zoologist and ethologist
William Laird III, 57, United States Senator from West Virginia
Paul Ayshford Methuen, 4th Baron Methuen , 87, English painter, zoologist and landowner
Wang Shusheng, 68, Chinese general

January 8, 1974 (Tuesday)
Born:
Kristian Bergström, Swedish footballer; in Åtvidaberg, Sweden
Adriana Bombom (born Adriana Soares), Brazilian dancer, model, television host and actress; in Rio de Janeiro, Brazil
John Eriksson (a.k.a. Hortlax Cobra), Swedish musician and composer (Peter Bjorn and John); in Hortlax, Piteå Municipality, Sweden
Jürg Grünenfelder, Swiss Olympic alpine skier; in Netstal, Canton of Glarus, Switzerland
Nobuhisa Isono, Japanese footballer; in Gunma Prefecture, Japan
Olga Lugina, Ukrainian tennis player
Michel Martone, Italian jurist and academic; in Nice, France
Fethi Missaoui, Tunisian Olympic boxer
Massimiliano Mori, Italian road bicycle racer; in San Miniato, Tuscany, Italy
Nicholas White, South African racing cyclist; in Johannesburg, Gauteng, South Africa
Died:
Michael Dempsey, 55, American bishop of the Catholic Church
Charles-Édouard Ferland, 81, Canadian jurist and politician
Blanche Reverchon, 94, French psychoanalyst

January 9, 1974 (Wednesday)

In the first leg of the 1973 European Super Cup, played at San Siro in Milan, Italy, A.C. Milan defeated AFC Ajax by a score of 1–0.
Michigan State Senator Charles N. Youngblood Jr. resigned his seat in the Senate following his conviction for bribe conspiracy.
Born:
Farhan Akhtar, Indian actor and director; in Bombay, India
Stevie Crawford, Scottish footballer and manager; in Dunfermline, Scotland
Darren Debono, Maltese footballer
Wangay Dorji, Bhutanese footballer; in Thimpu, Bhutan
Omari Hardwick, American actor, poet, rapper and producer; in Savannah, Georgia
Jesulín de Ubrique (born Jesús Janeiro Bazán), Spanish bullfighter; in Ubrique, Province of Cádiz, Spain
Nicole Johnson, Miss America 1999; in St. Petersburg, Florida
Christian Nielsen, Danish football manager
Ramón Nomar, Spanish pornographic actor; in Caracas, Venezuela
Sávio (born Sávio Bortolini Pimentel), Brazilian footballer; in Vila Velha, Brazil
Kenta Shinohara, Japanese manga artist; in Chiba Prefecture, Japan
Jamain Stephens, National Football League offensive tackle; in Lumberton, North Carolina
Died:
Heinz Kähler, 68, German art historian and archaeologist
Eitel-Friedrich Kentrat, 67, Kriegsmarine officer, commander of German submarine U-74, Knight's Cross of the Iron Cross recipient

January 10, 1974 (Thursday)
Skylab 4: The crew had a day off (only about a third of their time was scheduled). Edward Gibson spent most of the day watching the Sun; he also conferred with Robert MacQueen, the principal investigator for the Skylab coronagraph, about solar observation strategy for the following weeks. Gerald Carr and William Pogue spent time looking out the wardroom window.
Detective Police Constable Othman Bin Ahmad of the Royal Malaysia Police and his partner were ambushed by six criminals at a sugarcane plantation in Cuping, Perlis, Malaysia. Othman fought and killed one of the criminals but was himself killed. He would be posthumously awarded the Grand Knight of Valour in 1975.
Navnirman Andolan (Re-invention Movement): In solidarity with the protest by engineering school students in Ahmedabad, India, university students called for a bandh, which turned into a two-day riot in Ahmedabad and Vadodara, with police firing on the crowd.
The Troubles: 53-year-old civilian John Crawford, a Catholic, was shot and killed near his workplace in Belfast by the Ulster Volunteer Force.
At 15:38:00.17 GMT, at the Nevada Test Site, the United States conducted the Pinedrops-Bayou - 2, Pinedrops-Sloat - 1 and Pinedrops-Tawny - 3 nuclear tests as part of the Operation Arbor test series. These were simultaneous tests carried out in the same hole.
Born:
Johan Botha, South African Olympic middle-distance runner; in Pretoria, Gauteng, South Africa
Jemaine Clement, New Zealand actor, musician and comedian (Flight of the Conchords); in Masterton, New Zealand
Davide Dionigi, Italian footballer and manager; in Modena, Italy
John Fassel, National Football League coach; in Anaheim, California
Khadija Jaballah, Tunisian Paralympic athlete
Andrey Korneyev, Russian Olympic swimmer; in Omsk, Omsk Oblast, Russian SFSR, Soviet Union (died 2014)
Kelly Marcel, British screenwriter, actress and television producer; in London, England
Steve Marlet, French footballer; in Pithiviers, France
Bob Peeters, Belgian footballer and manager; in Lier, Belgium
R.A. the Rugged Man (born Richard Andrew Thorburn), American rapper and producer; in Suffolk County, New York
Hrithik Roshan, Indian actor; in Bombay, India
Sabrina Setlur, German rapper and songwriter; in Frankfurt, West Germany
Gur Shelef, Israeli basketball player
Beata Sokołowska-Kulesza, Polish Olympic sprint canoer; in Gorzów Wielkopolski, Lubusz Voivodeship, Poland
Onyok Velasco (born Mansueto Velasco, Jr.), Filipino Olympic boxer; in Bago, Negros Occidental, Philippines
Japhet Zwane, South African footballer; in Umlazi, South Africa
Died:
Gertrude Bambrick, 76, American silent film actress
Charles G. Bond, 96, member of the United States House of Representatives from New York
Eddie Safranski, 55, American jazz double bassist, composer and arranger
Martin Scherber, 66, German composer

January 11, 1974 (Friday)
On the island of Djerba, Tunisia, Habib Bourguiba and Muammar Gaddafi signed the Djerba Declaration, committing Tunisia and Libya to becoming a single state, the Arab Islamic Republic. Referendums were scheduled in each country to vote on the issue.
The Troubles in Derry: 53-year-old Cecilia Byrne and 46-year-old John Dunne, both Catholic civilians employed by the British Army, were killed by a car bomb planted by the Official Irish Republican Army. The bomb exploded shortly after the car left Ebrington Barracks in Derry.
A propane tank exploded at an apartment complex in West St. Paul, Minnesota, killing three firefighters and the wife of the apartment caretaker.
Born:
Kim Chambers, American pornographic actress; in Fullerton, California
Giuseppe Filianoti, Italian lyric tenor; in Reggio Calabria, Italy
Roman Görtz, German footballer; in Berlin, Germany
Michael Kohlmann, German tennis player; in Hagen, West Germany
Goran Lozanovski, Australian Olympic and professional footballer and football manager; in Melbourne, Australia
Cody McKay, Canadian Major League Baseball catcher; in Vancouver, British Columbia, Canada
Jens Nowotny, German footballer; in Malsch, West Germany
David, Elizabeth, Emma, Grant, Jason and Nicolette Rosenkowitz, the Rosenkowitz sextuplets, were born in Cape Town, South Africa, the first recorded occurrence of sextuplets in the world where all six babies survived.
Max von Essen, American actor and vocalist; in Long Island, New York
Xiong Ni, Chinese Olympic champion diver; in Changsha, Hunan, China
Died:
Margit Barnay, 77, German silent film actress
Antonio Bautista, 36, Philippine Air Force pilot (killed in action)
Josef Chloupek, 65, Austrian footballer
Clotilde von Derp (born Clotilde Margarete Anna Edle von der Planitz), 81, German expressionist dancer
Yūzō Yamamoto, 86, Japanese novelist and playwright

January 12, 1974 (Saturday)
Rank-and-file soldiers of the Negele Borana garrison of the Ethiopian Ground Forces mutinied over bad food and the lack of drinking water. They seized Emperor Haile Selassie's personal envoy to them, Lt. Gen. Deresse Dubale, and forced him to eat and drink as they did for a week.
As support for the Djerba Declaration quickly collapsed, the referendum in Tunisia on the creation of the Arab Islamic Republic was postponed. The unification plan would never be implemented.
57-year-old Stephanie Britton and her 4-year-old grandson, Christopher Martin, were stabbed to death at their home on Hadley Green Road in the London Borough of Barnet.  the case remained unsolved, although serial killer Patrick Mackay was a suspect.

The Sturgeon-class submarine USS Richard B. Russell (SSN-687), built at Newport News Shipbuilding, was launched in Newport News, Virginia, sponsored by Mrs. Herman Talmadge.
The Pro Football Hall of Fame elected four new inductees, who would be enshrined on July 27: From the Chicago Bears, Bill George, Cleveland Browns long-time placekicker Lou Groza, Detroit Lions interception master Night Train Lane and Green Bay Packers running back Tony Canadeo.
Born:
Melanie C (born Melanie Jayne Chisholm), English singer-songwriter (Spice Girls); in Whiston, Merseyside, England
Claudia Conserva, Chilean actress, model and television presenter; in Santiago, Chile
Alpin Gallo, Albanian footballer; in Librazhd, Albania
Tor Arne Hetland, Norwegian Olympic champion cross-country skier; in Stavanger, Norway
Robert Hickey, New Zealand Olympic basketball player; in Whakatane, Bay of Plenty, New Zealand
Eri Irianto, Indonesian footballer; in Sidoarjo Regency, East Java, Indonesia (died 2000)
Richard Kitzbichler, Austrian footballer and manager; in Wörgl, Tyrol, Austria
Ivica Mornar, Croatian footballer; in Split, Socialist Republic of Croatia, Socialist Federal Republic of Yugoslavia
Thomas FitzGerald, Earl of Offaly (died 1997 in traffic collision)
Arkadiusz Onyszko, Polish Olympic and professional footballer; in Lublin, Poland
Milen Petkov, Bulgarian footballer; in General Toshevo, Bulgaria
Nina Proll, Austrian actress; in Vienna, Austria
Hámilton Ricard, Colombian footballer; in Quibdó, Chocó Department, Colombia
Aaron Seltzer, American-Canadian filmmaker and screenwriter; in Mississauga, Ontario, Canada
Remigijus Šimašius, Lithuanian lawyer and politician; in Tauragė, Lithuanian Soviet Socialist Republic, Soviet Union
Séverine Vandenhende, French Olympic judo champion; in Dechy, Nord, France
Died:
Jack Jacobs, 54, National Football League and Canadian Football League quarterback and halfback
Chris Mackintosh (born Charles Ernest Whistler Mackintosh), 70, Scottish rugby union player, skier, bobsledder and Olympic long jumper
Nunzio Malasomma, 79, Italian film director and screenwriter
Princess Patricia of Connaught, 87, granddaughter of Queen Victoria

January 13, 1974 (Sunday)
The 1974 Commonwealth Paraplegic Games were opened in Dunedin, New Zealand, by Sir Denis Blundell, the Governor-General of New Zealand. They continued until January 19.
The Troubles: 43-year-old Catholic civilian Christopher Daly was found shot to death by the Official Irish Republican Army in Belfast.
New Zealand racing driver Denny Hulme won the 1974 Argentine Grand Prix at Autodromo Municipal Ciudad de Buenos Aires, Argentina.
Dallas-Fort Worth Regional Airport opened for scheduled airline service.

In Super Bowl VIII, held at Rice Stadium in Houston, Texas, the American Football Conference (AFC) champion Miami Dolphins retained their title as National Football League champions, defeating the National Football Conference (NFC) champion Minnesota Vikings by a score of 24–7.
Born:
Ravinder Bhalla, American politician; in Passaic, New Jersey
Sergei Brylin, Russian ice hockey player and coach; in Moscow, Russian SFSR, Soviet Union
Jorge Cabrera, Uruguayan basketball player
Thierry Debès, French footballer; in Strasbourg, France
Leonardo Fernández, Bolivian footballer; in Avellaneda, Buenos Aires Province, Argentina
Sergey Garbuzov, Russian Olympic water polo player; in Moscow, Russian SFSR, Soviet Union
Urs Kunz, Swiss Olympic Nordic combined skier; in Wald, Zürich, Switzerland
Marios Kyriakou, Cypriot footballer
Matt Lepsis, National Football League offensive tackle; in Conroe, Texas
Mary Jo Sanders, American professional boxer; in Detroit, Michigan
Mark Sanger, British film editor; in London, England
Jason Sasser, American basketball player; in Denton, Texas
Kaili Vernoff, American actress; in Los Angeles, California
Died:
Charles Finn, 76, American Olympic water polo player
Wim Groskamp, 87, Dutch Olympic footballer
Raoul Jobin, 67, French-Canadian operatic tenor
Salvador Novo, 69, Mexican author and television presenter, official chronicler of Mexico City

January 14, 1974 (Monday)
The Troubles: 41-year-old Protestant civilian Andrew Jordan was found shot to death by the Ulster Volunteer Force in a field in Carrowdore, County Down.
Jules Léger was sworn in as the 21st Governor General of Canada, succeeding the retiring Roland Michener.
The 1974 Virginia Slims of San Francisco women's tennis tournament opened at the Civic Auditorium in San Francisco, California. It would continue until January 19.
Born:
Kevin Durand, Canadian actor; in Thunder Bay, Ontario, Canada
David Flitcroft, English footballer and manager; in Bolton, England
Nancy Johnson, American Olympic champion sport shooter; in Phenix City, Alabama
Stavroula Kozompoli, Greek Olympic water polo player; in Athens, Greece
Hugues Legault, Canadian Olympic swimmer; in Montreal, Quebec, Canada
Jorge Leitão, Portuguese footballer and manager; in Oporto, Portugal
Fabiana Luperini, Italian cyclist; in Pontedera, Tuscany, Italy
Federico Lussenhoff, Argentine footballer; in Venado Tuerto, Argentina
Rastislav Michalík, Slovak footballer; in Staškov, Czechoslovakia
Died:
Joseph Dippolito, 59, American Mafia member
Knut Lund, 82, Finnish Olympic footballer
Günther Niethammer, 65, German ornithologist, Waffen-SS member
Richard Petzoldt, 66, German musicologist and music critic
Cassiano Ricardo, 78, Brazilian journalist, literary critic and poet
Hugo Stoltzenberg, 90, German chemical warfare engineer
Östen Undén, 87, Swedish academic, civil servant and politician, acting Prime Minister of Sweden

January 15, 1974 (Tuesday)
Ernesto Geisel of the National Renewal Alliance party won the 1974 Brazilian presidential election, which was conducted by an electoral college.
A school bus-type vehicle carrying farm workers fell into a drainage canal southwest of Blythe, California and near Ripley, California at approximately 6:30 a.m. PST, before sunrise, killing 19 and injuring 28.
Watergate scandal: A panel of technical experts testified that the 18½-minute gap in the tape recording of President Nixon's conversation with H. R. Haldeman on June 20, 1972, was made by someone pushing the record-erase button at least five times and as many as nine times. White House attorney James D. St. Clair objected to all questions about whether the erasure was deliberate.
The Teamsters began a strike at five supermarket chains representing 80% of the food sales in southeastern Michigan.
The Knight Street Bridge opened, joining Vancouver and Richmond, British Columbia.
Happy Days, a sitcom about life in the 1950s, debuted on ABC.
At the 1974 NBA All-Star Game, played at the Seattle Center Coliseum in Seattle, Washington, the West team defeated the East team by a score of 134–123.
Born:
Edith Bowman, Scottish radio DJ and TV presenter; in Anstruther, Fife, Scotland
Séverine Deneulin, international development academic
Jan Holický, Czech Olympic alpine skier; in Teplice, Czechoslovakia
Ray King, Major League Baseball relief pitcher; in Chicago, Illinois
Noriko Koiso (born Noriko Hamaguchi), Japanese Olympic basketball player; in Nagasaki, Japan
Adam Ledwoń, Polish footballer; in Olesno, Poland (died 2008)
Hideki Uchidate, Japanese footballer; in Saitama, Saitama Prefecture, Japan
Died:
Harold D. Cooley, 76, member of the United States House of Representatives from North Carolina
Charles Rosher, A.S.C., 88, English-born cinematographer
Yosef Serlin, 67, Zionist activist, lawyer and Israeli politician, member of the Knesset
Nikolay Skvortsov, 74, Soviet politician
Sam Slyfield, 75, American sound engineer (Walt Disney Productions)
Josef Smrkovský, 62, Czechoslovak politician

January 16, 1974 (Wednesday)
McCulkin murders: Barbara McCulkin and her daughters Vicki and Leanne disappeared from their home in Highgate Hill, Queensland, Australia. Their bodies were never located. Garry Dubois and Vincent O'Dempsey were found guilty of their kidnapping and murder in 2016 and 2017, respectively.

In the second leg of the 1973 European Super Cup, played at Olympic Stadium in Amsterdam, Netherlands, AFC Ajax defeated A.C. Milan by a score of 6–0, winning the Cup 6–1 on aggregate.
On its final scheduled voyage, the cargo transport MV Prosperity was driven onto La Conchée Reef off Guernsey due to engine failure and sank. All 18 crewmen were lost; only 16 bodies were recovered.
The American fishing vessel John and Olaf iced up in a storm and washed up on rocks in Jute Bay, south central Alaska. The four crewmen – John Blaalid, Arthur H. Gilbert, David A. Gilbert and Ivar Gjerde, all of Kodiak, Alaska – were lost.
Born:
Frédéric Dindeleux, French footballer; in Lille, France
Brent Hinds, American musician (Mastodon); in Pelham, Alabama
Mattias Jonson, Swedish footballer; in Kumla Municipality, Sweden
Àngel Llàcer, Spanish actor and television presenter; in Barcelona, Spain
Gaëtan Llorach, French Olympic alpine skier; in Saint-Martin-d'Hères, Isère, France
Kate Moss, English supermodel; in Croydon, Greater London, England
Kati Winkler, German Olympic ice dancer; in Karl-Marx-Stadt, East Germany
Died:
Johnny Barfield, 64, American country and old-time music performer
Roy Bargy, 79, American composer and pianist
Fred A. Seaton, 64, United States Senator from Nebraska and U.S. Secretary of the Interior
Suey Welch (born Stephen H. Welch), 74-76, American football player and boxing promoter

January 17, 1974 (Thursday)
The two divers, Pier Skipness and Robert John Smyth, both died from rapid decompression and drowning.
The Troubles: 22-year-old Robert Jameson, an Ulster Defence Regiment soldier, was shot and killed by the Irish Republican Army while returning home from work in Trillick, County Tyrone. The same day, 73-year-old Catholic civilian Daniel Hughes was shot and killed during a Loyalist gun attack on Boyle's Bar in Cappagh, County Tyrone.
Pauline McGibbon of Ontario became the first female lieutenant governor of a Canadian province.
The United Nations Security Council adopted Resolution 345, making Chinese the Council's fifth working language.
A Douglas DC-3A-191 airliner crashed near Chigorodó, Colombia, killing all twelve people on board.
Born:
Marco Antonio Barrera, Mexican boxer; in Mexico City, D.F., Mexico
Ladan and Laleh Bijani, Iranian craniopagus twin sisters; in Firuzabad, Fars, Iran (died 2003 after surgical separation)
Dror Cohen, Israeli basketball player and coach; in Ramat Gan, Israel
Mitya Fomin (born Dmitri Anatolevich Fomin), Russian vocalist, dancer and producer; in Novosibirsk, Russian SFSR, Soviet Union
Annemarie Jacir, Palestinian filmmaker, writer and producer; in Bethlehem
Vesko Kountchev (born Vesselin Valentinov Kountchev), Bulgarian musician; in Sofia, Bulgaria
Derrick Mason, National Football League wide receiver; in Detroit, Michigan
Keith Robinson, American actor and contemporary R&B singer; in Louisville, Kentucky
Yang Chen, Chinese footballer and coach; in Beijing, China
Died:
Clara Edwards, 93, American singer, pianist and composer
Sándor Glancz, 65, Hungarian table tennis player

January 18, 1974 (Friday)
The Israeli and Egyptian governments signed the Israel-Egypt Disengagement Treaty of 1974, ending conflict on the Egyptian front of the Yom Kippur War.
In West Germany, the Bundestag passed the Bundes-Immissionsschutzgesetz ("Federal Emission Control Act").
Glenis Carruthers, a student teacher, was strangled to death on Clifton Down in Bristol, England, after leaving her 21st birthday party.  the case remained unsolved.
Correctional Officer Luell Wheeler Barrow of the Alabama Department of Corrections was stabbed to death after being taken hostage, along with another guard, during a prisoner uprising at Holman Correctional Facility in Atmore, Alabama.
Born:
Princess Claire of Belgium (born Claire Louise Coombs); in Bath, Somerset, England
Morena Gallizio, Italian Olympic alpine skier; in Bolzano, Italy
Marco Geisler, German Olympic rower; in Cottbus, East Germany
Gustavo Kupinski, Argentine guitarist; in Buenos Aires, Argentina (died 2011)
Tri Kusharjanto, Indonesian Olympic badminton player; in Yogyakarta, Special Region of Yogyakarta, Indonesia
Steve Lomas, Northern Irish footballer and manager; in Hanover, West Germany
Vladimir Miholjević, Croatian Olympic and professional road bicycle racer
Maulik Pancholy, American actor and author; in Dayton, Ohio
Ansar Razak, Indonesian footballer; in Jakarta, Indonesia (died 1998)
Elena Smurova, Russian Olympic water polo player; in Leningrad, Russian SFSR, Soviet Union
Thibaut Vallette, French military officer and Olympic champion team eventing equestrian
Died: Bill Finger, 59, American comic strip and comic book writer, co-creator of Batman

January 19, 1974 (Saturday)
Australian racing driver John McCormack won the 1974 New Zealand Grand Prix at Wigram Airfield Circuit, Christchurch, Canterbury, New Zealand. It was his second consecutive New Zealand Grand Prix victory.
Vietnam War: The Battle of the Paracel Islands between China and South Vietnam began.
French President Georges Pompidou and his cabinet decided to float the French franc for six months, abandoning intervention in money markets to maintain the franc's value. The change took effect when trading opened on Monday, January 20.
The Troubles: In east Belfast, riots broke out following the arrest of a Protestant man.
Shortly before midnight, guerrillas of the People's Revolutionary Army (Argentina) attacked the headquarters of the 10th Armored Cavalry Regiment in Azul, Buenos Aires, Argentina. Mario Roberto Santucho organized the attack, which Enrique Gorriarán Merlo led on the ground. Among those killed in the fighting were Colonel Camilo Arturo Gay, the base commander, and his wife, Hilda Irma Casaux. The guerrillas also took Lt. Col. Jorge Ibarzábal hostage and executed him ten months later.
Byron De La Beckwith was acquitted on federal firearms charges for bringing a live time bomb into New Orleans in his car in order to bomb the home of Anti-Defamation League regional director Adolph Botnick. De La Beckwith had previously been tried twice in Mississippi for the 1963 assassination of Medgar Evers, with both trials resulting in hung juries. De La Beckwith would be convicted of conspiracy to commit murder in the Botnick case on August 1, 1975. He would be convicted of Evers' murder in 1994 and sentenced to life in prison.
In Woodbranch, Texas, a 22-year-old man was arrested after taking 13 people hostage during a supermarket robbery.
In college (men's) basketball, Notre Dame defeated UCLA 71–70, ending the Bruins' record 88-game winning streak.
Born:
Dainius Adomaitis, Lithuanian Olympic and professional basketball player and coach; in Šakiai, Marijampolė County, Lithuanian SSR, Soviet Union
Marcelo Baron Polanczyk, Brazilian footballer; in Santa Rosa, Rio Grande do Sul, Brazil
Frank Caliendo, American comedian, actor and impressionist; in Chicago, Illinois
Francesco Cozza, Italian football and manager; in Cariati, Italy
Diane Cummins, Canadian Olympic middle-distance runner; in Pinetown, KwaZulu-Natal, South Africa
Demetrius Ferreira, Brazilian footballer; in São Paulo, Brazil
Walter Jones, National Football League offensive tackle; in Aliceville, Alabama
Ian Laperrière, Canadian-American ice hockey player and coach; in Montreal, Quebec, Canada
Natassia Malthe, Norwegian model and actress; in Oslo, Norway
Brian Martin, American Olympic luger; in Palo Alto, California
Jaime Moreno, Bolivian footballer; in Santa Cruz de la Sierra, Bolivia
Éva Novodomszky, Hungarian journalist and presenter; in Szarvas, Hungary
Tarik Oulida, Dutch footballer; in Amsterdam, Netherlands
Pablo Quatrocchi, Argentine footballer and coach; in Quilmes, Argentina
Badran Al-Shaqran, Jordanian footballer; in Ar-Ramtha, Jordan
Died:
Wiktor Biegański, 81, Polish actor, film director and screenwriter
Antonio Fernós-Isern, 78, Puerto Rican cardiologist, Resident Commissioner of Puerto Rico
Abram Khavin, 59/60, Ukrainian chess master
Edward Seago, 63, British artist

January 20, 1974 (Sunday)
Vietnam War: The Battle of the Paracel Islands ended in victory for China, which established control over the Paracel archipelago.
The Troubles:
33-year-old Desmond Mullan, a Catholic civilian, was shot and killed in Carrickfergus, Northern Ireland, by a Loyalist group. The same day, the body of Ulster Defence Regiment Captain Cormac McCabe, 42, was found shot in the head near Aughnacloy, County Tyrone; he had been killed by the Provisional Irish Republican Army. These two killings brought the death toll from the Troubles in Northern Ireland over the previous four years to 940.
A mailbox was bombed outside the Europa Hotel, Belfast, slightly injuring two people. Late on the night of January 20, a truck was hijacked and set on fire in east Belfast.
The People's Revolutionary Army guerrillas remaining at the army base in Azul, Buenos Aires, Argentina, escaped after sunrise. That night, General Juan Perón, the President of Argentina, made a nationally televised speech in which he vowed "to annihilate as soon as possible this criminal terrorism".
At the 1974 Pro Bowl, played at Arrowhead Stadium in Kansas City, Missouri, the AFC (American Football Conference) team defeated the NFC (National Football Conference) team by a score of 15–13.

The General Dynamics F-16 Fighting Falcon made its unscheduled first flight at Edwards Air Force Base, California. While performing high-speed ground tests, pilot Phil Oestricher nearly lost control of the aircraft when it entered a series of roll oscillations. Oestricher elected to take the craft airborne to avoid crashing and remained in flight for six minutes. Oestricher would pilot the F-16's official first flight on February 2.
Born:
Komlan Assignon, Togolese footballer; in Lomé, Togo
Rae Carruth (born Rae Lamar Wiggins), National Football League wide receiver and convicted murderer; in Sacramento, California
David Dei, Italian footballer and coach; in Arezzo, Italy
Stevimir Ercegovac, Croatian Olympic shot putter; in Zagreb, Socialist Republic of Croatia, Socialist Federal Republic of Yugoslavia
Alvin Harrison, American Olympic champion track and field athlete; in Orlando, Florida
Calvin Harrison, American Olympic track and field athlete, identical twin brother of Alvin Harrison; in Orlando, Florida
Yevgeni Kharlachyov, Russian footballer and coach; in Tolyatti, Russian SFSR, Soviet Union
Vjekoslav Kobešćak, Croatian Olympic water polo player and coach; in Zagreb, Socialist Republic of Croatia, Socialist Federal Republic of Yugoslavia
Florian Maurice, French Olympic and professional footballer; in Sainte-Foy-lès-Lyon, France
Neru (born Francisco Borja Enrique Ayesa), Spanish footballer; in Laredo, Cantabria, Spain
Hans Erik Ødegaard, Norwegian footballer and manager; in Drammen, Norway
Valeria Parrella, Italian author, playwright and actress; in Torre del Greco, Province of Naples, Italy
Tengku Muhammad Fa-iz Petra, Crown Prince (Tengku Mahkota) of the Malaysian state of Kelantan; in Kota Bharu, Kelantan, Malaysia
Died:
Boris Balashov, 46, Soviet journalist and philatelist
Edmund Blunden , 77, English poet, author and critic
Leonard Freeman, 53, American television writer and producer, creator of Hawaii Five-O
John H. Hilldring, 78, United States Army Major General
Paul Sidney Martin, 74, American anthropologist and archaeologist
Karl von Oven, 85, German World War II general
Kuba Shaaban, 84, Circassian writer, historian and playwright
Hermann Weyland, 85, German chemist and paleobotanist

January 21, 1974 (Monday)
Skylab 4: Astronaut Ed Gibson observed a solar flare from beginning to end with the Apollo Telescope Mount, recording a 23-minute description of the event.
In Pisa, Italy, three police officers were sentenced to 6 months and 10 days in prison for perjury about the murder of the anarchist Franco Serantini, who died in prison on May 7, 1972.
The Troubles: An automobile loaded with bombs exploded in downtown Belfast, causing damage but no injuries.
The Troubles in Derry: 32-year-old British Army soldier John Haughey was killed by a remote-controlled IRA bomb hidden in an electricity distribution box in Creggan, Derry, which was detonated when Haughey's foot patrol passed it.
The United States Supreme Court delivered its ruling in the case of Cleveland Board of Education v. LaFleur. In a 7–2 decision, the Court held that compulsory maternity leave for teachers beginning a specified number of months before childbirth was unconstitutional.
The 1974 U.S. Professional Indoor men's tennis tournament opened at the Wachovia Spectrum in Philadelphia, Pennsylvania. It would continue until January 27.
Born:
Malena Alterio, Spanish actress; in Buenos Aires, Argentina
Maxwell Atoms (born Adam Maxwell Burton), American animator, screenwriter, storyboard artist and voice actor; in Philadelphia, Pennsylvania
Remy Auberjonois, American actor
Dani Bouzas, Spanish footballer; in Arteixo, Province of A Coruña, Spain
Kim Dotcom (born Kim Schmitz), German-Finnish Internet entrepreneur and political activist; in Kiel, West Germany
Robert Ghiz, Canadian politician, 31st Premier of Prince Edward Island; in Charlottetown, Prince Edward Island, Canada
Arthémon Hatungimana, Burundian Olympic middle-distance runner; in Muhweza, Karuzi Province, Burundi
Dave Joerger, American basketball coach; in Staples, Minnesota
Vincent Laresca, American actor; in New York City, New York
Rove McManus (born John Henry Michael McManus), Australian comedian and television and radio presenter; in Perth, Western Australia
Haris Mujezinović, Bosnian basketball player; in Visoko, Socialist Republic of Bosnia and Herzegovina, Socialist Federal Republic of Yugoslavia
Aleksandr Shatskikh, Kazakh footballer; in Taldıqorğan, Kazakh SSR, Soviet Union (died 2020)
Alex Sperafico, Brazilian racing driver; in Toledo, Paraná, Brazil
Marco Zanotti, Italian road bicycle racer; in Rovato, Lombardy, Italy
Died:
Arnaud Denjoy, 90, French mathematician
Sandy Griffiths (born Benjamin Mervyn Griffiths), 65, Welsh football referee and teacher
Robert Guy Howarth, 67, Australian scholar, literary critic and poet
Hans Lauda, 77, Austrian industrialist
Lewis Strauss, 77, American politician and United States Navy Rear Admiral, acting U.S. Secretary of Commerce
Ken Viljoen, 63, South African cricketer

January 22, 1974 (Tuesday)
The German Navy submarine , built at Nordseewerke in Emden, West Germany, was launched.
General Juan Perón wrote a letter to the army personnel at the Azul garrison which guerrillas attacked the previous weekend. In the letter, Perón said that "the small number of psychopaths that are remaining [will] be exterminated one by one for the good of the Republic."
The decommissioned United States Navy destroyer escort USS Raymond (DE-341) was used as a target vessel and sunk by aircraft from USS Forrestal (CVA-59) off northeast Florida.
Born:
Jörg Böhme, German footballer and manager; in Hohenmölsen, East Germany
Eva Cruz, Puerto Rican volleyball player; in Toa Baja, Puerto Rico
Barbara Dex (born Barbara Maria Karel Deckx), Belgian singer; in Turnhout, Belgium
Daniel Fagiani, Argentine footballer; in Pujato, Argentina
Annette Frier, German actress and comedian; in Cologne, West Germany
Sami Helenius, Finnish professional ice hockey defenceman; in Jokela, Finland
James Kakande, English pop singer; in Manchester, England
Kaysha (born Edward Mokolo Jr.), Congolese singer, rapper and producer; in Kinshasa, Zaire
Zoltán Kész, Hungarian civil activist and politician; in Veszprém, Hungary
Sergei Kormiltsev, Russian and Ukrainian footballer and coach; in Barnaul, Russian SFSR, Soviet Union
Olga Markova, Russian figure skater; in Leningrad, Russian SFSR, Soviet Union
Cameron McConville, Australian racing driver and motorsport celebrity; in Melbourne, Victoria, Australia
Joseph Muscat, Maltese politician; in Pietà, Malta
Crystal Robinson, American basketball player and coach; in Atoka, Oklahoma
Stephanie Rottier, Dutch tennis player; in Sint-Niklaas, Belgium
Jenny Silver (born Jenny Maria Öhlund), Swedish singer; in Ängelholm, Sweden
Died:
Eugeniusz Arct, 74, Polish painter
Oskar Herman, 87, Croatian Jewish painter
Anna Lehr, 83, American stage and silent film actress
Antanas Sniečkus, 71, First Secretary of the Communist Party of Lithuania

January 23, 1974 (Wednesday)
The Austrian Parliament adopted a new Criminal Code, which took effect on January 1, 1975.
A fire at a boarding school in Heusden, Belgium, killed 23 teenaged boys.
Berwyn Mountain UFO incident: A small earthquake in North Wales coincided with atmospheric lights and led to reports of a UFO sighting.
Skylab 4: Due to waning public interest in space exploration, the major American television networks announced that there would be no live coverage of Skylab 4's splashdown the following month. This would be the first time since 1966 that the return of a crewed NASA spacecraft would not be broadcast live.
Born:
Joel Bouchard, Canadian ice hockey defenceman; in Montreal, Quebec, Canada
Glen Chapple, English cricketer; in Skipton, North Yorkshire, England
Derek Cianfrance, American filmmaker; in Lakewood, Colorado
Chris Corner, English record producer and musician; in Middlesbrough, Yorkshire, England
Bernard Diomède, French footballer and manager; in Saint-Doulchard, France
Scott Doran, Irish Gaelic footballer; in Kilmore, County Wexford, Ireland (died 2018)
Rebekah Elmaloglou, Australian actress; in Paddington, New South Wales, Australia
Jack D. Fischer, United States Air Force officer, test pilot and astronaut; in Louisville, Colorado
Funky (born Luis Raul Marrero), Puerto Rican rapper and songwriter; in San Juan, Puerto Rico
Ulrich Le Pen, French footballer; in Auray, Brittany, France
Anne Marivin, French actress; in Senlis, Oise, Picardy, France
Norah O'Donnell, American television journalist; in San Antonio, Texas
Yosvani Pérez, Cuban baseball pitcher; in Rodas, Cienfuegos Province, Cuba
Suzy Shortland, New Zealand rugby union player
Richard T. Slone, English painter; in Newton-in-Furness, England
Tiffani Thiessen, American actress; in Long Beach, California
Yuki Urushibara, Japanese manga artist; in Yamaguchi Prefecture, Japan
Died:
Alfred Buntru, 87, German academic, member of the Nazi Party
Helmuth Kahl, 72, German Olympic modern pentathlete
Athalia Ponsell Lindsley, 56, American model, dancer and activist, was hacked to death with a machete in her front yard in St. Augustine, Florida. The murder remains unsolved.

January 24, 1974 (Thursday)
The 1974 British Commonwealth Games, known as "The Friendly Games", were opened by Prince Philip, Duke of Edinburgh, in Christchurch, Canterbury, New Zealand. They would continue until February 2.

Cyclone Wanda crossed the coast of Queensland, Australia, leading to the 1974 Brisbane flood, which caused 16 deaths, 300 injuries and nearly AUD$980 million in damage.
1974 Bangladeshi presidential election: Mohammad Mohammadullah was elected unopposed as President of Bangladesh by the Jatiya Sangsad.
A Togolese Air Force Douglas C-47 Skytrain carrying Étienne Eyadéma, the President of Togo, crashed near the village of Sarakawa, Togo. Eyadéma falsely claimed that he was the sole survivor of the crash as a means to enhance his reputation. He subsequently changed his first name to "Gnassingbé" to commemorate the date of the crash.
A man threw a parcel bomb into the Bank Hapoalim, an Israeli bank, in Lawrence Lane, London. The bomb exploded, slightly injuring an employee.
Students at Glasgow University organized a boycott of the school refectory to protest high meal prices. Some students attempting to enter the refectory were punched and kicked, and the police were called, but made no arrests. The Students' Representative Council released a statement denying any association with the persons who attempted to use physical intimidation during the boycott.
The Troubles in Strabane: Four members of the Irish Republican Army hijacked a helicopter and used it to drop two milk churns packed with explosives onto Strabane Police Station in County Tyrone, Northern Ireland. One milk churn landed in a garden and failed to explode; the other landed in a river.
A Greek court sentenced two Black September Organization terrorists to death for carrying out the 1973 Athens Hellinikon International Airport attack. The two men's sentences were changed from death to life imprisonment the following month in response to the demands of terrorists who had taken Greek hostages in Pakistan. The Hellinikon attackers would be deported to Libya in May.
Watergate scandal: Egil Krogh, a former aide to U.S. President Nixon and leader of the White House Plumbers, was sentenced to six months in prison. Krogh had authorized the September 1971 burglary of the office of Daniel Ellsberg's psychiatrist in Los Angeles.
General Motors announced plans to lay off 75,000 hourly workers, 50,000 of them in Michigan, at 14 plants by March.
Born:
Tim Biakabutuka, National Football League running back; in Kinshasa, Zaire
Cyril Despres, French rally racer; in Nemours, France
Attila Fekete, Hungarian Olympic fencer; in Halmeu, Satu Mare County, Romania
Michaël Gillon, Belgian astronomer and astrophysicist; in Liège, Belgium
José Antonio Gordillo, Spanish footballer and manager; in Morón de la Frontera, Province of Seville, Spain
Tanja Hart, German Olympic volleyball player; in Marktheidenfeld, Bavaria, West Germany
Ed Helms, American actor and comedian; in Atlanta, Georgia
Mattias Hugosson, Swedish footballer; in Valbo, Sweden
Michael Madsen, Danish footballer and manager; in Frederiksberg Municipality, Denmark
Sarah Ruhl, American playwright, professor and essayist; in Wilmette, Illinois
Kristy Sargeant, Canadian Olympic pair skater; in Red Deer, Alberta, Canada
Melissa Tkautz, Australian actress, singer, model and presenter; in Sydney, New South Wales, Australia
Died:
Andrew Dewar Gibb MBE QC, 85, Scottish advocate, barrister, professor and politician
Cornelius O'Callaghan, 51/52, Irish Fianna Fáil politician

January 25, 1974 (Friday)
Skylab 4: The crew became the world record holders for time spent in space, breaking the mark set by the Skylab 3 crew in September 1973.
Navnirman Andolan (Re-invention Movement): The protesting students in Gujarat, India, organized a state-wide strike that led to clashes with police in about 33 cities and the government imposing a curfew in 44 towns. The riots caused by the rise in food prices would spread from Gujarat to Maharashtra, and then to Bihar in March.
Israel Defense Forces troops began a full-scale withdrawal from the west bank of the Suez Canal. United Nations troops moved into the positions vacated by the IDF.
Bülent Ecevit of CHP formed the new government of Turkey (37th government, partner MSP).
The Troubles: 19-year-old British Army soldier Howard Fawley was killed in an IRA land mine attack on a British Army foot patrol in Ballymaguigan, County Londonderry.
Yale University announced that the Vinland map, which purportedly showed the portion of North America explored by Leif Erikson in the 11th century, was a 20th-century forgery.
Vietnam War:
United States Army Lt. Col. Anthony Herbert filed a $44 million libel suit against CBS for portraying him as a liar in connection with his allegations about a military cover-up of Vietnam War atrocities.
The United States Department of State announced that Gerald Emil Kosh, a civilian United States Department of Defense employee who had been captured on January 20 after the Chinese landing on Pattle Island during the Battle of the Paracel Islands, was being held by the People's Republic of China.
In Minnesota, American actor Marlon Brando attended jury selection at the trial of American Indian Movement leaders Dennis Banks and Russell Means to show his support for the defendants, who had been indicted on charges related to the 1973 occupation of Wounded Knee.
A pipeline failed near Liberty, Texas, spilling over 200 barrels of oil into the Trinity River.
Born:
Hinako Ashihara, Japanese manga artist; in Hyōgo Prefecture, Japan
Adam Bousdoukos, German actor; in Hamburg, West Germany
Robert Budreau, Canadian filmmaker; in London, Ontario, Canada
Claudelle Deckert, German actress and model; in Düsseldorf, West Germany
Nuno Espírito Santo, Portuguese footballer and manager; in São Tomé, Portuguese São Tomé and Príncipe
Lidiya Grigoryeva, Russian Olympic long-distance runner; in Smychka, Chuvash Autonomous Soviet Socialist Republic, Russian SFSR, Soviet Union
Emily Haines, Canadian singer and songwriter; in New Delhi, India
Utkirbek Haydarov, Uzbekistani Olympic boxer; in Andijan, Andijan Region, Uzbek SSR, Soviet Union
Phill Jones, New Zealand Olympic and professional basketball player; in Christchurch, Canterbury, New Zealand
Igor Miladinović, Serbian chess grandmaster; in Niš, Socialist Federal Republic of Yugoslavia
Attilio Nicodemo, Italian footballer; in Rome, Italy
Matt Odmark, American folk rock guitarist (Jars of Clay); in New York City, New York
Dan Serafini, Major League Baseball relief pitcher; in San Francisco, California
Roman Yegorov, Russian Olympic swimmer
Died:
William Fawcett (born William Fawcett Thompson), 79, American character actor
James Pope-Hennessy CVO, 57, British biographer and travel writer (murdered)

January 26, 1974 (Saturday)
Turkish Airlines Flight 301 crashed and burned shortly after takeoff from Izmir Cumaovası Airport (now İzmir Adnan Menderes Airport). 66 of the 73 people on board the Fokker F28 Fellowship aircraft were killed.
The Troubles: 50-year-old John Rodgers, a member of the Royal Ulster Constabulary, was shot and killed by the Irish Republican Army while on foot patrol in Glengormley, County Antrim.
18-year-old laborer Guðmundur Einarsson disappeared while walking home on a snowy night from a dance hall in Hafnarfjörður, Iceland. His disappearance was the beginning of the Guðmundur and Geirfinnur case, widely considered a miscarriage of justice.
In Spokane, Washington, as many as 175 employees of Pathology Associates Medical Laboratories, Inc., were sickened by Shigella after a company banquet at the Ridpath Hotel.
At the 31st Golden Globe Awards, The Exorcist won the award for Best Drama, while American Graffiti won the award for Best Comedy or Musical.
Born:
Blanche Bilongo, Cameroonian actress, screenwriter, presenter and film editor; in Monatélé, Cameroon
David Castedo, Spanish footballer; in Palma de Mallorca, Balearic Islands, Spain
César Cruchaga, Spanish footballer; in Ezcároz – Ezkaroze, Navarre, Spain
Elena Donati, Italian Olympic swimmer; in Brescia, Province of Brescia, Italy
Chris Hesse, rock drummer and vocalist (Hoobastank)
Simone Malusa, Italian Olympic snowboarder; in Ivrea, Province of Turin, Italy
Radka Popova, Bulgarian Olympic biathlete; in Sapareva Banya, Kyustendil Province, Bulgaria
Rokia Traoré, Malian singer, songwriter and guitarist; in Beledougou, Mali
Omar Treviño Morales, Mexican criminal; in Nuevo Laredo, Tamaulipas, Mexico
Albert van den Berg, South African rugby union player; in Hoopstad, South Africa
Died:
Joe Benjamin, 54, American jazz bassist
Boris Bychowsky, 65, Soviet scientist and parasitologist
Ranulf Compton, 95, member of the United States House of Representatives from Connecticut
Thomas Whitfield Davidson, 97, United States federal judge
Julius Patzak, 75, Austrian tenor
Ivan Privalov, 71, Ukrainian footballer
Archie Semple, 45, Scottish jazz clarinetist and bandleader

January 27, 1974 (Sunday)

The cargo ship MV Captayannis ran aground on a sandbar in the Firth of Clyde, Scotland, after strong winds caused it to drag its anchor and drift into the anchor chains of the BP tanker British Light. All crew members were rescued. The ship would sink the following morning; its wreck remains in place in the River Clyde.
Brazilian racing driver Emerson Fittipaldi won the 1974 Brazilian Grand Prix at Interlagos Circuit in São Paulo, Brazil.
Vietnam War: The United States observed National MIA Awareness Day, proclaimed by President Nixon to mark the first anniversary of the Paris Peace Accords by honoring American Vietnam War personnel who remained missing in action.
Born:
Ole Einar Bjørndalen, Norwegian Olympic champion biathlete; in Drammen, Norway
Tim Harden, American Olympic track and field athlete; in Kansas City, Missouri
Marco Malvaldi, Italian chemist and crime writer; in Pisa, Italy
Yves Nzabouamba, Gabonese footballer
Andrei Pavel, Romanian Olympic tennis player and tennis coach; in Constanța, Constanța County, Romania
Jasmin Samardžić, Croatian footballer; in Rijeka, Socialist Republic of Croatia, Socialist Federal Republic of Yugoslavia
Chaminda Vaas, Sri Lankan international cricketer; in Mattumagala (near Wattala), Sri Lanka
Died:
Leo Geyr von Schweppenburg, 87, German general
Richard Gregg, 88, American social philosopher
Georgios Grivas, 76, Greek Cypriot general in the Hellenic Army
Paula Ludwig, 74, Austrian/German poet
Sir Edward Louis Spears, 1st Baronet, 87, British Army major-general and Member of Parliament
Carlo Zinelli, 57, Italian outsider artist

January 28, 1974 (Monday)
The 1974 Federal Territory of Kuala Lumpur Agreement was signed at Istana Negara, Jalan Istana, Kuala Lumpur, Malaysia, by Yang di-Pertuan Agong Tuanku Abdul Halim Muadzam Shah and Salahuddin of Selangor.
Navnirman Andolan (Re-invention Movement): Due to the ongoing protests in Ahmedabad, India, the Indian Army was called in to restore order.

The Muhammad Ali vs. Joe Frazier II boxing match was held at Madison Square Garden in New York City. Ali won by unanimous decision.
The Teamsters supermarket strike in Michigan ended.
An aircraft flying to Owatonna, Minnesota, for an inspection of law enforcement facilities crashed, killing all four on board, including Thief River Falls Chief of Police Roy Leonard Pederson, two city council members and the pilot.
Born:
Patrick Banda, Zambian footballer (died 1993)
Tony Delk, American basketball player; in Covington, Tennessee
Steve Dugardein, Belgian footballer; in Mouscron, Belgium
Jermaine Dye, Major League Baseball right fielder; in Oakland, California
Óscar Henríquez, Venezuelan Major League Baseball relief pitcher; in La Guaira, Vargas, Venezuela
Davana Medina, American figure competitor; in Ponce, Puerto Rico
Haila Mompié, Cuban singer; in Amancio, Cuba
Ramsey Nasr, Dutch author and actor; in Rotterdam, Netherlands
Ty Olsson, Canadian actor; in Halifax, Nova Scotia, Canada
Magglio Ordóñez, Venezuelan Major League Baseball right fielder and politician; in Caracas, Venezuela
Kari Traa, Norwegian Olympic champion freestyle skier; in Voss, Norway
Yao Xia, Chinese footballer and coach; in Chongqing, China
Died:
Ed Allen (musician), 76, American jazz trumpeter and cornetist
Oswald Cornwallis, 79, English Royal Navy officer and cricketer
Eleazar Huerta Valcárcel, 70, Spanish lawyer, poet and politician
Giuseppe Moro, 53, Italian footballer

January 29, 1974 (Tuesday)
The 1974 European Figure Skating Championships opened in Zagreb, Socialist Republic of Croatia, Socialist Federal Republic of Yugoslavia. They would continue until February 2.
The Troubles: 79-year-old Protestant civilian Matilda Withrington was shot and killed in her home during an Irish Republican Army sniper attack on a Royal Air Force bus in Newcastle, County Down.
The Troubles in Derry: 43-year-old William Baggeley of the Royal Ulster Constabulary was shot and killed by the IRA while on foot patrol in Derry.
The 1974 Baltimore International men's tennis tournament opened at Towson State College in Baltimore, Maryland, while the 1974 Richmond WCT men's tennis tournament opened in Richmond, Virginia. Both tournaments would continue until February 3.
The 27th National Hockey League All-Star Game was held at Chicago Stadium in Chicago, Illinois.
Born:
Michael Andersen, Danish basketball player; in Copenhagen, Denmark
Niall Blaney, Irish politician, Teachta Dála for Donegal North-East (Dáil constituency), Seanad Éireann for the Agricultural Panel; in Letterkenny, County Donegal, Ireland
Kris Burley, Canadian Olympic artistic gymnast; in Truro, Nova Scotia, Canada
David LaFleur, National Football League tight end; in Lake Charles, Louisiana
Sara Nakayama, Japanese voice actress; in Saitama Prefecture, Japan
Mălina Olinescu, Romanian singer; in Bucharest, Romania (died 2011)
Ndialou Paye, Senegalese Olympic basketball player; in Dakar, Senegal
Kōji Wada, Japanese pop singer; in Fukuchiyama, Kyoto, Japan (died 2016 from nasopharyngeal carcinoma)
Died:
Dillon Anderson, 67, American lawyer and National Security Advisor
H. E. Bates, 68, English author
Kate Gardiner, 88, New Zealand mountaineer
Benjamin Steinberg, 58, American concert violinist, conductor and civil rights activist
Jules Wabbes, 54, Belgian furniture designer and interior architect

January 30, 1974 (Wednesday)
The Troubles: 36-year-old Protestant civilian Thomas Walker, an alleged informer, was shot and killed at his home in Belfast by a Loyalist group.
Watergate scandal: U.S. President Richard Nixon delivered the 1974 State of the Union Address to the 93rd United States Congress. Referring to "the so-called Watergate affair", Nixon said: "I believe the time has come to bring that investigation and the other investigations of this matter to an end. One year of Watergate is enough." Near the end of the speech, Nixon stated: "I want you to know that I have no intention whatever of ever walking away from the job that the people elected me to do for the people of the United States." Nixon would resign the presidency on August 9 due to the Watergate scandal.
Leonard Woodcock, President of the United Auto Workers, called for a temporary curb on foreign automobile imports to the United States in the wake of high unemployment in the automobile industry.
At the 1974 ABA All-Star Game, played at Norfolk Scope in Norfolk, Virginia, the East team defeated the West team by a score of 128–112.
Pan Am Flight 806 crashed on approach to Pago Pago International Airport in American Samoa due to microburst-induced wind shear. 97 of the 101 people on board died as a result of the accident. Almost all the deaths were due to a fire that broke out after the crash.
Born:
Christian Bale, English actor; in Haverfordwest, Wales
Carl Broemel, American rock guitarist (My Morning Jacket)
Nataliya Burdeyna, Ukrainian Olympic archer; in Odessa, Ukrainian Soviet Socialist Republic, Soviet Union
Gilber Caro, Venezuelan politician and activist; in Catia, Caracas, Venezuela
Olivia Colman, English actress; in Norwich, Norfolk, England
Maren Eggert, German actress; in Hamburg, West Germany
Jemima Goldsmith, British journalist; in Chelsea, London, England
Roger Hammond, English Olympic bicycle racer; in Oxford, Oxfordshire, England
Martina Jerant, Canadian Olympic basketball player; in Windsor, Ontario, Canada
Terquin Mott, American basketball player; in Philadelphia, Pennsylvania
Jailton Nunes de Oliveira, Brazilian footballer
Sebastián Rambert, Argentinian footballer and coach; in Bernal, Argentina
Renny Ribera, Bolivian footballer; in Santa Cruz de la Sierra, Bolivia
Abdel-Zaher El-Saqqa, Egyptian footballer; in Dakahlia, Egypt
Siluck Saysanasy, Laotian-Canadian television actor; in Vientiane, Laos
Charlie Zaa (born Carlos Alberto Sánchez), Colombian singer; in Girardot, Cundinamarca, Colombia
Died:
Fernand Arnout, 74, French Olympic weightlifter
Jimmy Hogan, 91, English footballer and coach
Olav Roots, 63, Estonian conductor, pianist and composer
Grigory Vorozheykin, 78, Soviet Air Force general
Bill Whitty, 87, Australian cricketer

January 31, 1974 (Thursday)
Skylab 4: The crew held their second televised press conference from space, during which commander Gerald Carr commented, "As long as things stay rather routine in the space program...public interest will stay pretty low." After the end of the press conference, the astronauts also answered questions from a sixth-grade class, including whether astronaut Pogue felt like "more of a man" after being in space and whether the crew missed feminine companionship.
Vietnam War:
The People's Republic of China released Gerald Emil Kosh, the American civilian captured during the Battle of the Paracel Islands.
The South Vietnamese government and the Viet Cong announced that they would resume prisoner of war exchanges on February 8, after a suspension of seven months.
A Pentagon spokesman announced that the United States Air Force was dropping charges against Capt. Donald Dawson, who had refused to fly a bombing mission over Cambodia after the signing of the Vietnam peace agreement. He was granted conscientious objector status and would be honorably discharged the following month.
Laju incident: Two members of the Japanese Red Army (JRA) and two members of the Popular Front for the Liberation of Palestine (PFLP) made a failed attempt to blow up oil tanks at the Shell oil refinery complex on Pulau Bukom, Singapore. The terrorists then hijacked the ferry Laju and took its five crew members hostage.
The 1974 Men's British Open Squash Championship commenced at Abbeydale Park in South Yorkshire, England. It would continue until February 8.
The Troubles in Newtownabbey: In Newtownabbey, County Antrim, a suburb north of Belfast, two armed robbers entered a workmen's hut and seized the week's wages of the 13 laborers inside. They then ordered the Protestants present to kneel on the floor. After two or three men did so, the gunmen opened fire on the other people in the hut, killing two Catholics (37-year-old Terence McCafferty and 29-year-old James McCloskey) and wounding three other men, including a Protestant. The gunmen were members of the Ulster Freedom Fighters.
By a vote of 18 to 6, the United States House Committee on Education and Labor rejected an amendment to a school aid bill that would have prohibited the use of federal funds for desegregation busing.
Lee Huebner, a speechwriter for U.S. President Nixon, resigned to join Whitney Communications.
General Motors announced record profits of $2.4 billion for 1973. Delta Air Lines announced that its net profits for 1973 were $74.9 million, the highest earned to that date by an air carrier from ordinary operations in one calendar year.
Betty Foster, a 34-year-old Littleton, Colorado woman, died from suicide by carbon monoxide poisoning when she ran her car in the closed garage of her condominium building. A forced-air heating system sucked the fumes into two apartments, where they killed five other people, including Foster's husband and three of her children.
At a meeting in Scottsdale, Arizona, National League baseball team owners approved the sale of the San Diego Padres to Ray Kroc, the former CEO of McDonald's.
Actress Linda Lovelace was arrested on drug possession charges at the Dunes Hotel in Las Vegas, Nevada.
Born:
Afu-Ra (born Aaron Phillip), American underground rapper; in New York City, New York
Ary Abittan, French actor and humorist; in Paris, France
Silke Bodenbender, German actress; in Bonn, West Germany
Othella Harrington, American basketball player and coach; in Jackson, Mississippi
Ian Huntley, English murderer; in Grimsby, Lincolnshire, England
Andrew Lockington, Canadian film score composer; in Burlington, Ontario, Canada
Ariel Pestano, Cuban professional and Olympic champion baseball catcher; in Caibarién, Villa Clara Province, Cuba
Anna Silk, Canadian actress; in Fredericton, New Brunswick, Canada
Michael Waltz, United States Army Special Forces officer and member of the United States House of Representatives from Florida; in Boynton Beach, Florida
Died:
Pedro Benítez, 73, Paraguayan footballer
Pina Gallini, 85, Italian actress
Samuel Goldwyn, 94, American film producer
Paul Haesaerts, 72, Belgian artist
Glenn Morris, 61, American Olympic athlete
Roger Pryor, 72, American film actor
Emil Väre, 88, Finnish Olympic champion wrestler

References

January 1974 events
1974-01
1974-01
1974